Joseph Palmer Abbott  (18 October 1891 – 7 May 1965) was an Australian politician. He was a member of the Country Party and served in the House of Representatives from 1940 to 1949, representing the Division of New England. During World War II he briefly held ministerial office as Minister for Home Security and assistant minister to the defence and army ministers.

Early life and career
Abbott was born in North Sydney, New South Wales, son of Joseph Palmer Abbott and his second wife Edith, and educated at The Armidale School and the University of Sydney, where he graduated with a Bachelor of Arts in 1913.  He enlisted in the Australian Imperial Force in February 1915 and served at Gallipoli.  He was invalidated to England in October 1915 where he was discharged from the AIF so that he could join the Royal Field Artillery of the British Army in December 1915.  In September 1918, he was awarded a Military Cross on the Western Front for putting out a fire. After the war, he became a farmer near Wingen and in 1924, he married Katherine Bliss Wilkinson.  He became president of the Graziers' Association of New South Wales in 1935 and was president of the Graziers' Federal Council of Australia in 1937 and 1938.

Political career
Abbott was elected as a Country Party member for the Australian House of Representatives seat of New England in the 1940 election.  He was appointed to the new portfolio of Home Security in the Menzies ministry in June 1941 and was responsible for civil defence until the fall of the Fadden government in November 1941.  In 1942 he was appointed chairman of the Administrative Planning Committee, which was responsible for organising supplies for the United States forces in Australia during World War II.  He retired from parliament prior to the 1949 election.

Personal life
Abbott was appointed an Officer of the Order of the British Empire (OBE) in 1951. He died in the Sydney suburb of Camperdown, New South Wales and was survived by his wife and a son. One of his half-brothers, Mac, was the member for Upper Hunter in the New South Wales Legislative Assembly from 1913 to 1918 and a Senator from 1935 to 1941, while the other  John Henry was a novelist and poet.

References

 

1891 births
1965 deaths
National Party of Australia members of the Parliament of Australia
Members of the Australian House of Representatives for New England
Members of the Australian House of Representatives
Members of the Cabinet of Australia
Australian recipients of the Military Cross
Australian Officers of the Order of the British Empire
20th-century Australian politicians
Australian military personnel of World War I
British Army personnel of World War I
Royal Field Artillery officers
Military personnel from Sydney
Australian Army soldiers